Khurtsilava is a Georgian surname that may refer to:

 Inga Khurtsilava (born 1975), Georgian chess player with title of Woman Grandmaster
 Murtaz Khurtsilava (born 1943), Georgian footballer
 Theimuraz Khurtsilava (born 1979), Georgian boxer

Surnames of Abkhazian origin
Georgian-language surnames